French Cancan (also known as Only the French Can) is a 1955 French-Italian musical film written and directed by Jean Renoir and starring Jean Gabin and Francoise Arnoul. 
Where Renoir's previous film Le Carosse d’or had celebrated the 18th-century Italian commedia dell’arte, this work is a homage to the Parisian café-concert of the 19th century with its popular singers and dancers. Visually, the film evokes the paintings of Edgar Degas and the Impressionists, including his own father, Pierre-Auguste Renoir. It also marked his return to France and to French cinema after an exile that began in 1940.

It was shot at the Joinville Studios in Paris. The film's sets were designed by the art director Max Douy.

Plot
In Paris in the 1890s, Henri Danglard owns a night club where the star turn is a belly dance by his mistress Lola. Going after the show one night to an old-fashioned dance hall in Montmartre, he sees people doing the cancan together and is struck by the suppleness and charm of a young laundry girl called Nini. He persuades her to take dancing lessons for a new venture he is planning. As his club has failed and Lola has left him, his idea is to open another place with a troupe of glamorous girls performing the cancan. Naming it the Moulin Rouge, its opening night is a thunderous success.

Cast
 Jean Gabin as Henri Danglard
 Françoise Arnoul as Nini
 María Félix as Lola
 Anna Amendola as Esther Georges
 Jean-Roger Caussimon as Baron Walter
 Dora Doll as La Génisse
 Giani Esposito as Prince Alexandre
 Gaston Gabaroche as Oscar, le pianiste
 Jacques Jouanneau as Bidon
 Jean Parédès as Coudrier
 Franco Pastorino as Paulo, le boulanger
 Michèle Philippe as Eleonore
 Michel Piccoli as Le Capitaine Valorgueil
 Albert Rémy as Barjolin
 Philippe Clay as Casimir le Serpentin
 Édith Piaf as Eugénie Buffet
 Pierre Olaf as Roberto, pierrot siffleur

Critical reception
François Truffaut reviewed the film in Arts magazine in May 1955 and called it a milestone in the history of colour of cinema. "Every scene is a cartoon in movement [-] Madame Guibole's dance class reminds us of a Degas sketch." Whilst Truffaut did not consider it as important a film as Rules of the Game or The Golden Coach, he nevertheless praised it as an example of Renoir "as vigorous and youthful as ever."  This affirmative response was not shared by Bernard Chardère however, writing in Positif, who criticised the music, the sets, even the final cancan scene. "The phoniness of the rue Lepic, with its vegetable carts and piles of artificial stones is painful to look at. The actors act. The audience gets bored. The dance rehearsals are Degas all right, but the kind that appears on Post Office calendars."

The film received the Grand Prix de l'Academie du Cinéma in 1956. Roger Ebert added French Cancan to his "Great Movies" list in 2012.

References

External links

French Cancan an essay by Andrew Sarris at the Criterion Collection

1950s musical comedy-drama films
1950s historical comedy films
1955 films
María Félix
Films directed by Jean Renoir
Films set in the 1880s
Films set in the 1890s
Films set in Paris
Films set in cabarets
French musical comedy-drama films
French historical comedy films
Italian historical comedy films
Films shot at Joinville Studios
Italian historical musical films
Italian musical comedy-drama films
1950s Italian films
1950s French films